All I Need to Know about Filmmaking I Learned from the Toxic Avenger is the autobiography of Lloyd Kaufman, published by Berkley Boulevard, a subsidiary of Penguin Putnam, in 1998. Kaufman is the co-founder of B-movie company Troma Entertainment and the director of such films as The Toxic Avenger, Class of Nuke 'Em High, and Terror Firmer. The book was written by both Kaufman and screenwriter James Gunn; they had previously collaborated on the 1996 film Tromeo and Juliet. Gunn went on to more mainstream prominence as the writer of Dawn of the Dead (2004) and the writer-director of Slither (2006) and the Marvel Studios 2014 film Guardians of the Galaxy.

Contents
The book was written by Gunn after having numerous long interviews with Kaufman about his life. The book is written in a darkly humorous style, and is an unusual mish-mash of personal memories, how-to-make-movies advice, and pure flights of fantasy, such as the fictional ongoing struggles with the book's editor, Barry Neville.

Gunn had this to say:

Most of the scenes are real, though the dialogue had to be recreated. Some scenes, however, are pretty much fantasies – for instance, the fight scenes between Lloyd and Pat, and most of the stuff between Lloyd and the editor, Barry (who loved being our villain). In non-fiction, veracity is only important with people who might sue you. In a lot of ways the book was practice for melding fiction and fact, as I did in a more shadowy manner in The Toy Collector. Still, Lloyd's hyperactive voice was so clearly in my head that I think the book is an accurate representation of who he is.

The book's working title was Sex, Violence, and Toxic Waste, but was changed by the publisher.

The introduction to the book was written by legendary B-movie producer, Roger Corman.

Editions
  (paperback, 1998)

References

External link 
 James Gunn Article on All I Need to Know About Filmmaking I Learned from the Toxic Avenger

The Toxic Avenger (franchise)
1998 non-fiction books
Show business memoirs
Non-fiction books about film directors and producers